Channohalli is a village in the southern state of Karnataka, India. It is located in the Nelamangala taluk of Bangalore Rural district.

Demographics 
Channohalli had population of 222 of which 108 are males while 114 are females as per report released by Census India 2011.

Geography 
The total geographical area of village is 83.35 hectares.

Bus Route from Bengaluru City 
Yeshwantapura  - Nelamangala - Dabbaspete

See also 

 Nijagal Kempohalli
 Bengaluru Rural District

References

External links 

Villages in Bangalore Rural district